Rosehill is a historic home and property at Gambrills, Anne Arundel County, Maryland. The dwelling displays a complex construction evolution originating from a mid-18th-century frame, -story double-pile plan house with an unusual short side passage. This is believed to be the first documented example of this form in the Chesapeake Bay region. The six outbuildings include an early-19th-century frame corn house, a documented 1821 frame tobacco barn, a log outbuilding, a late-19th-century stable, and a late-19th- or early-20th-century pumphouse. The Hopkins family owned the property for 173 years, from 1799 until 1972.

It was listed on the National Register of Historic Places in 1987.

References

External links
, including photo from 1986, at Maryland Historical Trust

Houses on the National Register of Historic Places in Maryland
Houses in Anne Arundel County, Maryland
National Register of Historic Places in Anne Arundel County, Maryland
1750 establishments in Maryland